Gairigaun is a village located near Phikkal Bazar, Nepal.
It was known as Phikkal-3 and now it is Suryodaya Municipality-9.

Most of the villagers are depended on Agriculture and are Middle Classed.

Populated places in Ilam District